In Senegal, Mahayana Buddhism is followed by a very tiny portion of the Vietnamese community, but it is informal Buddhism because they only worship their ancestors by burning the incenses on a small altar and in the end of all prayers are: "Nam mô A Di Đà Phật" (Mean:"Glory to Buddha Amitabha") as traditional of Vietnamese faith that is  Bodhisattvas as Địa Tạng Vương Bồ tát and Quan Thế Âm Bồ tát will bless and teach the spirits of dead people how to take a better life in next incarnations or go to Nirvana forever.

Total Buddhists in Senegal is around 0.01% as maximum and 99% of all Buddhists there is Vietnamese descent.

Vietnamese people maybe the only one East Asian community in Senegal. With communities of European and Lebanese made-up about 1% of total population in Senegal.

References

See also
Buddhism
Chinese people in Senegal
Demographics of Senegal
Religion in Senegal
Vietnamese community in Senegal

Senegal
Buddhism in Africa